"The Old North State" is the official state song of the U.S. state of North Carolina. Written by William Gaston in 1835 and set to an arrangement composed by Mrs. E.E. Randolph in 1926,  it was adopted as the state song by the North Carolina General Assembly in 1927.

Lyrics
Carolina! Carolina! Heaven's blessings attend her!
While we live, we will cherish, protect and defend her;
Tho' the scorner may sneer at, and witlings defame her,
Still our hearts swell with gladness whenever we name her.

Hurrah! Hurrah! The Old North State ForeverHurrah! Hurrah! The good Old North State!Tho' she envies not others, their merited glory,Say whose name stands the foremost, in Liberty's story,   Tho' too true to herself e'er to crouch to oppression,Who can yield to just rule a more loyal submision?Hurrah! Hurrah! The Old North State forever!Hurrah! Hurrah! The good Old North State!Then let all those who love us, love the land that we live in,As happy a region as on this side of heaven,Where plenty and peace, love and joy smile before us,Raise aloud, raise together the heart thrilling chorus.Hurrah! Hurrah! The Old North State forever!Hurrah! Hurrah! The good Old North State!''

References

See also

 North Carolina State Toast

Music of North Carolina
North Carolina
1835 songs
Symbols of North Carolina
Songs about North Carolina